High Society is a 1956 soundtrack album, featuring Bing Crosby, Frank Sinatra, Louis Armstrong and Grace Kelly. This was Crosby's fifth LP album, and his first recorded for Capitol Records. It was the soundtrack for the MGM feature film High Society, also released in 1956. Initially issued on vinyl either in mono or stereo format, the album has been issued on CD by Capitol in Japan (CD: TOCP-6587) in 1991 and by Capitol in the UK (CD: CDP 793787-2) in 1995. The album was also included in a 3-CD box set called "Original Soundtrack Recordings" issued by the EMI Music Group Australasia

Crosby's exclusive recording contract with Decca Records expired at the end of 1955 and he chose to go freelance.

After his recording of "True Love" with Grace Kelly went gold, Crosby joked that it was the only gold record to feature a real-life princess. "True Love" was the only song in the album to be nominated for an Academy Award but it lost out to "Que Sera, Sera".

Reception
The UK magazine The Gramophone liked the album saying: "...Lastly on Capitol LCT6116 El Bingo is heard along with nearly everybody else—Louis Armstrong, Grace Kelly and Frank Sinatra, for example—in the film "High Society". These numbers by Cole Porter are mostly available by the same artists on 45s, but whichever way you buy it do not neglect the wonderful 'Now You Has Jazz', in which Crosby introduces the band. It is an old gambit, but seldom fails, and certainly not here."

Personnel in Louis Armstrong band
Louis Armstrong (tpt); Trummy Young (tbn); Edmond Hall (clt); Billy Kyle (pno); Arvell Shaw (bs); Barrett Deems (dms)

Track listing 
All songs written by Cole Porter.

Note: the stereo version of "Well, Did You Evah!" does not include Crosby's adlib "You must be one of the newer fellas."
Note 2: "Well, Did You Evah!", as b-side of "True Love", was edited to 2:52 on the 78 rpm-single.

Chart positions

Credits
 Bing Crosby, Frank Sinatra, Celeste Holm, Grace Kelly - vocals
 Louis Armstrong - trumpet, vocals
 Louis Armstrong's Band:
 Edmond Hall – clarinet
 Trummy Young – trombone
 Billy Kyle – piano
 Arvell Shaw – double bass
 Barrett Deems – drums
 Saul Chaplin - arranger, music supervisor
 Johnny Green - arranger, conductor, music supervisor
 Skip Martin, Nelson Riddle, Conrad Salinger - arranger

References

1956 soundtrack albums
Musical film soundtracks
Bing Crosby soundtracks
Capitol Records soundtracks
Albums conducted by Johnny Green